Merit College Preparatory Academy (MCPA) is a public chartered high school serving grades 7–12 in Springville, Utah, United States. It opened in 2008.

Facilities
It has classrooms, foreign language labs, a student store, art, dance, and music rooms, a kitchen and cafeteria, a separate gymnasium, and both indoor and outdoor sports facilities.

Education
Merit Academy uses university-style learning and assessment. The curriculum follows the state core content with some additions. Core subjects are taught by a licensed teacher with two assistants.  Core classrooms accommodate 45 students and can be divided into three smaller classrooms of 15 students when required, with a 15:1 student-teacher ratio.

Instructional Focus Tracks

Instructional Focus Tracks (IFTs), starting in the 10th grade, provide specialist teaching. Students can take 6.5 credits, of the total 27 credits they need to graduate, as an intensive focused study in the following areas:
 Concurrent Enrollment (College Credit)
 Business
 Science & Engineering
 Science & Math
 Computers & Technology
 English & Humanities
 Foreign Languages
 Fine Arts
 General Studies
 Individualized Focus

Students taking courses in the Business IFT, for example, will start and run their own businesses either online or at the student store, under the direction of Merit's business IFT faculty and volunteer professionals from the community.  A student in the Computers & Technology IFT might build a service robot in the Robotics course, or work on a website development team that produces a site for a real company. A student in the Fine Arts IFT might create a composition or short play staged and performed in the theater.

References

External links

Public high schools in Utah
Public middle schools in Utah
Charter schools in Utah
Schools in Utah County, Utah
2008 establishments in Utah
Buildings and structures in Springville, Utah